Peter Gibson is a British judge.

Peter Gibson can also refer to:

Peter Gibson (glazier), a British glazier
Peter Gibson (politician), a British Member of Parliament
Peter Gibson (writer), an American writer